Kim Young-tak (born 1976) is a South Korean film director and screenwriter. Kim wrote and directed the comedy film Hello Ghost (2010).  The comedy was a local hit - the 9th highest grossing Korean film in 2010, and won him the Best New Director (Film) at the 47th Baeksang Arts Awards in 2011. In 2018, Kim released the thriller novel Gomtang about a timetraveller who travels from 2063 to Busan of 2019 and is confronted with series of murders there. While initially published online, it was also published physically in two volumes.

Filmography 
A Bold Family (2005) - script editor
BA:BO (2008) - screenwriter
Hello Ghost (2010) - director, screenwriter
Slow Video (2014) - director, screenwriter

Bibliography 
 Gomtang (곰탕, 2018)
 Gomtang 2 (곰탕 2, 2018)

Awards 
2011 47th Baeksang Arts Awards: Best New Director (Film) (Hello Ghost)

References

External links 
 
 
 

1976 births
Living people
South Korean film directors
South Korean screenwriters